Monolistra bolei is a species of isopod in the family Sphaeromatidae.

The IUCN conservation status of Monolistra bolei is "EN", endangered. The species faces a high risk of extinction in the near future. The IUCN status was reviewed in 1996.

Subspecies
These two subspecies belong to the species Monolistra bolei:
 Monolistra bolei bolei Sket, 1960
 Monolistra bolei brevispinosa Sket, 1982

References

Sphaeromatidae
Articles created by Qbugbot
Crustaceans described in 1960